The João Coutinho-class corvettes were a series of warships built for the Portuguese Navy for service in Portugal's African and Indian colonies. Initially rated as frigates, they were downgraded first to corvettes and then patrol vessels with age. They were designed in Portugal by naval engineer Rogério de Oliveira, but the urgent need of their services in the Portuguese Colonial War meant that the construction of the ships was assigned to foreign shipyards. Six ships were built; the first three ships were built by Blohm & Voss and the remaining three by Empresa Nacional Bazán. The ships were launched in 1970 and 1971. The relative cheap cost of the design led to it being the basis of several other classes in other navies. From 1970 until the end of the conflict in 1975, the corvettes were used for patrol and fire-support missions in Angola, Mozambique, Guinea and Cape Verde. After the African colonies gained their independence, the corvettes were assigned to patrol duties in Portuguese territorial waters.

Design and description
In the 1960s Portugal still retained an empire and used a series of smaller vessels, such as frigates and gunboats to patrol its territorial waters. However in 1961, India invaded and annexed Portuguese colonies on the Indian subcontinent and further unrest in the Portuguese African colonies led to a boom in naval shipbuilding in response. The ships were powered by two OEW-Pielstick 12 PC2 2 V400 diesel engines turning two shafts creating .

The João Coutinho class was initially armed with a twin /50 calibre Mk 33 dual-purpose gun mount and a twin /L70 Bofors gun mount for anti-aircraft defence. The ships also mounted a Mk 10 Hedgehog anti-submarine (ASW) mortar, two Mk 6 depth charge projectors and two Mk 9 depth charge racks. The vessels carried 1,200 rounds of ammunition, 240 Hedgehog projectiles and up to 84 depth charges.

The corvettes were equipped with MLA-1B air search radar, a Mk 51 Mod 2 fire-control director for the 40 mm guns, a Mk 63 Mod 21 fire-control system and SPG-34 gunfire control radar for the 3-inch guns. For ASW, the vessels mounted a QCU-2 sonar. By 1987 all ASW equipment was removed and the MLA-1B radar was replaced with a Kelvin Hughes 1002 surface search radar from 1989 to 1991. In 1994, the SPG-34 radar and Mk 63 fire control system were removed, forcing the main guns to be controlled manually. The vessel's had an initial complement of 93 including 9 officers and had accommodations for 34 Marines. As equipment was removed, the number of personnel on the ships was reduced by 23. By 2009, the class was rated as corvettes and by 2013, patrol vessels.

Construction and service career
Though the vessels were designed in Portugal, the urgent need of their services in the Portuguese Colonial War meant that the construction of the ships was assigned to foreign shipyards. They were acquired to replace the older corvettes, sloops and gunboats in service with the Portuguese Navy. Three ships were constructed by Bazán at their shipyard in Cartagena, Spain and three by Blohm & Voss at their yard in Hamburg, West Germany. The ships were initially used to defend Portuguese interests in their empire until its collapse in 1975. After that, the vessels were predominantly used for fisheries protection. A mid-1980s refit was cancelled due to lack of funds.

Ships

Disposal
Honório Barreto was decommissioned in 2003 and Augusto de Castilho in 2004. The two ships were purchased by a metal company, RAPLUS, for scrapping in 2011. General Pereira D'Eça was decommissioned in 2014 and sunk off Madeira as an artificial reef in 2016. João Coutinho was decommissioned in 2014. In 2018, Jacinto Cândido was decommissioned.

Notes

Citations

References
 
 
 
 
 

 
Corvette classes
Corvettes of Germany